Christian Skeel (born 8 June 1956) is a Danish artist and composer. He lives and works in Copenhagen.

Education 
 1975–1979 Royal Danish Academy of Fine Arts (School of Architecture), Copenhagen
 1980–1986 Royal Danish Academy of Fine Arts (School of Visual Arts), Copenhagen
 1983 Cofounder of the gallery "Kongo", Cofounder of the Art magazine "Kong"
 1984 Starts the film sound studious "Mainstream" in Copenhagen
 1985 Cofounder of the Art magazine "Atlas"

References

External links 
 Danish Arts Council
 Weilbach's artist encyclopedia
Gallery Tom Christoffersen
Christian Skeel homepage
Skeel & Skriver homepage
PaintMaker

1956 births
Living people
Danish artists
Danish composers
Male composers